The 1960 VFL season was the 64th season of the Victorian Football League (VFL), the highest level senior Australian rules football competition in Victoria. The season featured twelve clubs, ran from 16 April until 24 September, and comprised an 18-game home-and-away season followed by a finals series featuring the top four clubs.

The premiership was won by the Melbourne Football Club for the eleventh time and second time consecutively, after it defeated  by 48 points in the 1960 VFL Grand Final.

Premiership season
In 1960, the VFL competition consisted of twelve teams of 18 on-the-field players each, plus two substitute players, known as the 19th man and the 20th man. A player could be substituted for any reason; however, once substituted, a player could not return to the field of play under any circumstances.

Teams played each other in a home-and-away season of 18 rounds; matches 12 to 18 were the "home-and-way reverse" of matches 1 to 7.

Once the 18 round home-and-away season had finished, the 1960 VFL Premiers were determined by the specific format and conventions of the Page–McIntyre system.

Alterations to 1960 match fixtures
Round 1 of the 1960 competition was played over Easter long weekend, with three matches on Easter Saturday (16 April) and three matches on Easter Monday (18 April). Round 2 of the competition was also scheduled for a long weekend, with four matches scheduled for the Saturday (23 April) and two for the Monday (Anzac Day, 25 April).

The four matches on Saturday 23 April were postponed because of the extremely wet conditions. Despite pressure from the Victorian Premier, Henry Bolte, the VFL refused to play the four postponed matches on Anzac Day (which, by custom, would have contributed to patriotic funds), and scheduled the postponed matches for the following Saturday (30 April). As a consequence of this delay all of the season's matches from Round 3 to the Grand Final were played a week later than had been originally scheduled.

Round 1

|- bgcolor="#CCCCFF"
| Home team
| Home team score
| Away team
| Away team score
| Venue
| Crowd
| Date
|- bgcolor="#FFFFFF"
| 
| 12.21 (93)
| 
| 9.12 (66)
| Windy Hill
| 23,000
| 16 April 1960
|- bgcolor="#FFFFFF"
| 
| 11.14 (80)
| 
| 3.7 (25)
| Victoria Park
| 39,927
| 16 April 1960
|- bgcolor="#FFFFFF"
| 
| 17.12 (114)
| 
| 8.15 (63)
| Lake Oval
| 28,100
| 16 April 1960
|- bgcolor="#FFFFFF"
| 
| 14.15 (99)
| 
| 5.14 (44)
| MCG
| 36,966
| 18 April 1960
|- bgcolor="#FFFFFF"
| 
| 15.7 (97)
| 
| 10.6 (66)
| Western Oval
| 24,982
| 18 April 1960
|- bgcolor="#FFFFFF"
| 
| 14.14 (98)
| 
| 14.14 (98)
| Princes Park
| 31,000
| 18 April 1960

Round 2

|- bgcolor="#CCCCFF"
| Home team
| Home team score
| Away team
| Away team score
| Venue
| Crowd
| Date
|- bgcolor="#FFFFFF"
| 
| 5.18 (48)
| 
| 10.12 (72)
| Junction Oval
| 30,000
| 25 April 1960
|- bgcolor="#FFFFFF"
| 
| 9.17 (71)
| 
| 9.10 (64)
| Brunswick Street Oval
| 33,815
| 25 April 1960
|- bgcolor="#FFFFFF"
| 
| 20.14 (134)
| 
| 14.6 (90)
| Kardinia Park
| 16,370
| 30 April 1960
|- bgcolor="#FFFFFF"
| 
| 6.17 (53)
| 
| 14.15 (99)
| Arden Street Oval
| 20,150
| 30 April 1960
|- bgcolor="#FFFFFF"
| 
| 5.15 (45)
| 
| 25.20 (170)
| Punt Road Oval
| 31,000
| 30 April 1960
|- bgcolor="#FFFFFF"
| 
| 6.16 (52)
| 
| 7.13 (55)
| Glenferrie Oval
| 30,000
| 30 April 1960

Round 3

|- bgcolor="#CCCCFF"
| Home team
| Home team score
| Away team
| Away team score
| Venue
| Crowd
| Date
|- bgcolor="#FFFFFF"
| 
| 5.12 (42)
| 
| 3.8 (26)
| Arden Street Oval
| 9,000
| 7 May 1960
|- bgcolor="#FFFFFF"
| 
| 16.14 (110)
| 
| 6.10 (46)
| MCG
| 23,135
| 7 May 1960
|- bgcolor="#FFFFFF"
| 
| 5.11 (41)
| 
| 8.7 (55)
| Brunswick Street Oval
| 13,802
| 7 May 1960
|- bgcolor="#FFFFFF"
| 
| 6.9 (45)
| 
| 6.17 (53)
| Glenferrie Oval
| 16,000
| 7 May 1960
|- bgcolor="#FFFFFF"
| 
| 11.10 (76)
| 
| 11.8 (74)
| Windy Hill
| 30,000
| 7 May 1960
|- bgcolor="#FFFFFF"
| 
| 5.11 (41)
| 
| 7.3 (45)
| Junction Oval
| 18,700
| 7 May 1960

Round 4

|- bgcolor="#CCCCFF"
| Home team
| Home team score
| Away team
| Away team score
| Venue
| Crowd
| Date
|- bgcolor="#FFFFFF"
| 
| 4.14 (38)
| 
| 9.5 (59)
| Kardinia Park
| 12,795
| 14 May 1960
|- bgcolor="#FFFFFF"
| 
| 7.13 (55)
| 
| 2.7 (19)
| Victoria Park
| 28,263
| 14 May 1960
|- bgcolor="#FFFFFF"
| 
| 5.18 (48)
| 
| 5.7 (37)
| Princes Park
| 11,066
| 14 May 1960
|- bgcolor="#FFFFFF"
| 
| 11.12 (78)
| 
| 5.8 (38)
| Lake Oval
| 7,000
| 14 May 1960
|- bgcolor="#FFFFFF"
| 
| 5.6 (36)
| 
| 6.11 (47)
| Punt Road Oval
| 7,500
| 14 May 1960
|- bgcolor="#FFFFFF"
| 
| 4.2 (26)
| 
| 4.11 (35)
| Western Oval
| 24,302
| 14 May 1960

Round 5

|- bgcolor="#CCCCFF"
| Home team
| Home team score
| Away team
| Away team score
| Venue
| Crowd
| Date
|- bgcolor="#FFFFFF"
| 
| 7.5 (47)
| 
| 4.7 (31)
| Punt Road Oval
| 12,500
| 21 May 1960
|- bgcolor="#FFFFFF"
| 
| 5.7 (37)
| 
| 7.15 (57)
| Glenferrie Oval
| 12,500
| 21 May 1960
|- bgcolor="#FFFFFF"
| 
| 11.9 (75)
| 
| 5.6 (36)
| Brunswick Street Oval
| 17,102
| 21 May 1960
|- bgcolor="#FFFFFF"
| 
| 10.6 (66)
| 
| 7.9 (51)
| Arden Street Oval
| 8,500
| 21 May 1960
|- bgcolor="#FFFFFF"
| 
| 5.9 (39)
| 
| 4.13 (37)
| Junction Oval
| 28,600
| 21 May 1960
|- bgcolor="#FFFFFF"
| 
| 17.13 (115)
| 
| 11.14 (80)
| Windy Hill
| 26,300
| 21 May 1960

Round 6

|- bgcolor="#CCCCFF"
| Home team
| Home team score
| Away team
| Away team score
| Venue
| Crowd
| Date
|- bgcolor="#FFFFFF"
| 
| 17.22 (124)
| 
| 4.8 (32)
| MCG
| 27,249
| 28 May 1960
|- bgcolor="#FFFFFF"
| 
| 6.11 (47)
| 
| 10.5 (65)
| Western Oval
| 22,126
| 28 May 1960
|- bgcolor="#FFFFFF"
| 
| 7.6 (48)
| 
| 9.8 (62)
| Arden Street Oval
| 8,600
| 28 May 1960
|- bgcolor="#FFFFFF"
| 
| 8.7 (55)
| 
| 6.14 (50)
| Brunswick Street Oval
| 25,632
| 28 May 1960
|- bgcolor="#FFFFFF"
| 
| 12.8 (80)
| 
| 11.12 (78)
| Lake Oval
| 27,000
| 28 May 1960
|- bgcolor="#FFFFFF"
| 
| 17.17 (119)
| 
| 10.14 (74)
| Kardinia Park
| 16,589
| 28 May 1960

Round 7

|- bgcolor="#CCCCFF"
| Home team
| Home team score
| Away team
| Away team score
| Venue
| Crowd
| Date
|- bgcolor="#FFFFFF"
| 
| 9.15 (69)
| 
| 10.11 (71)
| Windy Hill
| 32,500
| 4 June 1960
|- bgcolor="#FFFFFF"
| 
| 12.16 (88)
| 
| 16.8 (104)
| Victoria Park
| 23,740
| 4 June 1960
|- bgcolor="#FFFFFF"
| 
| 11.13 (79)
| 
| 13.13 (91)
| Princes Park
| 24,465
| 4 June 1960
|- bgcolor="#FFFFFF"
| 
| 14.15 (99)
| 
| 14.13 (97)
| Glenferrie Oval
| 16,500
| 4 June 1960
|- bgcolor="#FFFFFF"
| 
| 6.13 (49)
| 
| 11.15 (81)
| Punt Road Oval
| 16,000
| 4 June 1960
|- bgcolor="#FFFFFF"
| 
| 13.12 (90)
| 
| 9.12 (66)
| Junction Oval
| 26,250
| 4 June 1960

Round 8

|- bgcolor="#CCCCFF"
| Home team
| Home team score
| Away team
| Away team score
| Venue
| Crowd
| Date
|- bgcolor="#FFFFFF"
| 
| 13.12 (90)
| 
| 13.14 (92)
| Arden Street Oval
| 17,500
| 11 June 1960
|- bgcolor="#FFFFFF"
| 
| 13.18 (96)
| 
| 11.15 (81)
| Glenferrie Oval
| 12,000
| 11 June 1960
|- bgcolor="#FFFFFF"
| 
| 10.15 (75)
| 
| 6.8 (44)
| MCG
| 35,539
| 11 June 1960
|- bgcolor="#FFFFFF"
| 
| 13.12 (90)
| 
| 13.13 (91)
| Lake Oval
| 21,500
| 11 June 1960
|- bgcolor="#FFFFFF"
| 
| 11.17 (83)
| 
| 14.10 (94)
| Kardinia Park
| 24,119
| 11 June 1960
|- bgcolor="#FFFFFF"
| 
| 16.14 (110)
| 
| 10.13 (73)
| Victoria Park
| 29,853
| 11 June 1960

Round 9

|- bgcolor="#CCCCFF"
| Home team
| Home team score
| Away team
| Away team score
| Venue
| Crowd
| Date
|- bgcolor="#FFFFFF"
| 
| 10.8 (68)
| 
| 16.14 (110)
| Brunswick Street Oval
| 23,233
| 18 June 1960
|- bgcolor="#FFFFFF"
| 
| 13.10 (88)
| 
| 12.15 (87)
| Windy Hill
| 21,000
| 18 June 1960
|- bgcolor="#FFFFFF"
| 
| 18.12 (120)
| 
| 8.15 (63)
| Princes Park
| 13,897
| 18 June 1960
|- bgcolor="#FFFFFF"
| 
| 7.13 (55)
| 
| 8.19 (67)
| Junction Oval
| 23,900
| 18 June 1960
|- bgcolor="#FFFFFF"
| 
| 11.17 (83)
| 
| 12.11 (83)
| Punt Road Oval
| 13,000
| 18 June 1960
|- bgcolor="#FFFFFF"
| 
| 8.19 (67)
| 
| 10.14 (74)
| Western Oval
| 28,098
| 18 June 1960

Round 10

|- bgcolor="#CCCCFF"
| Home team
| Home team score
| Away team
| Away team score
| Venue
| Crowd
| Date
|- bgcolor="#FFFFFF"
| 
| 6.5 (41)
| 
| 12.11 (83)
| Kardinia Park
| 17,934
| 25 June 1960
|- bgcolor="#FFFFFF"
| 
| 11.14 (80)
| 
| 7.8 (50)
| Princes Park
| 26,979
| 25 June 1960
|- bgcolor="#FFFFFF"
| 
| 11.7 (73)
| 
| 13.6 (84)
| Lake Oval
| 22,300
| 25 June 1960
|- bgcolor="#FFFFFF"
| 
| 20.10 (130)
| 
| 15.18 (108)
| Brunswick Street Oval
| 15,747
| 2 July 1960
|- bgcolor="#FFFFFF"
| 
| 12.4 (76)
| 
| 10.14 (74)
| Windy Hill
| 25,700
| 2 July 1960
|- bgcolor="#FFFFFF"
| 
| 12.12 (84)
| 
| 14.13 (97)
| Punt Road Oval
| 28,000
| 2 July 1960

Round 11

|- bgcolor="#CCCCFF"
| Home team
| Home team score
| Away team
| Away team score
| Venue
| Crowd
| Date
|- bgcolor="#FFFFFF"
| 
| 7.12 (54)
| 
| 8.9 (57)
| Western Oval
| 15,322
| 9 July 1960
|- bgcolor="#FFFFFF"
| 
| 13.16 (94)
| 
| 10.13 (73)
| Victoria Park
| 20,915
| 9 July 1960
|- bgcolor="#FFFFFF"
| 
| 14.15 (99)
| 
| 4.18 (42)
| Junction Oval
| 16,500
| 9 July 1960
|- bgcolor="#FFFFFF"
| 
| 10.9 (69)
| 
| 12.14 (86)
| Glenferrie Oval
| 18,000
| 9 July 1960
|- bgcolor="#FFFFFF"
| 
| 12.11 (83)
| 
| 14.14 (98)
| Arden Street Oval
| 15,000
| 9 July 1960
|- bgcolor="#FFFFFF"
| 
| 9.17 (71)
| 
| 6.22 (58)
| MCG
| 29,741
| 9 July 1960

Round 12

|- bgcolor="#CCCCFF"
| Home team
| Home team score
| Away team
| Away team score
| Venue
| Crowd
| Date
|- bgcolor="#FFFFFF"
| 
| 11.13 (79)
| 
| 9.3 (57)
| Junction Oval
| 24,700
| 16 July 1960
|- bgcolor="#FFFFFF"
| 
| 9.19 (73)
| 
| 15.13 (103)
| Arden Street Oval
| 9,600
| 16 July 1960
|- bgcolor="#FFFFFF"
| 
| 11.13 (79)
| 
| 8.4 (52)
| Kardinia Park
| 14,388
| 16 July 1960
|- bgcolor="#FFFFFF"
| 
| 10.13 (73)
| 
| 16.11 (107)
| Glenferrie Oval
| 23,500
| 16 July 1960
|- bgcolor="#FFFFFF"
| 
| 17.10 (112)
| 
| 13.18 (96)
| Brunswick Street Oval
| 30,080
| 16 July 1960
|- bgcolor="#FFFFFF"
| 
| 8.8 (56)
| 
| 15.20 (110)
| Punt Road Oval
| 13,500
| 16 July 1960

Round 13

|- bgcolor="#CCCCFF"
| Home team
| Home team score
| Away team
| Away team score
| Venue
| Crowd
| Date
|- bgcolor="#FFFFFF"
| 
| 6.13 (49)
| 
| 6.9 (45)
| MCG
| 42,935
| 23 July 1960
|- bgcolor="#FFFFFF"
| 
| 9.10 (64)
| 
| 9.8 (62)
| Western Oval
| 14,133
| 23 July 1960
|- bgcolor="#FFFFFF"
| 
| 16.16 (112)
| 
| 10.10 (70)
| Windy Hill
| 17,000
| 23 July 1960
|- bgcolor="#FFFFFF"
| 
| 7.15 (57)
| 
| 7.16 (58)
| Victoria Park
| 18,637
| 23 July 1960
|- bgcolor="#FFFFFF"
| 
| 5.10 (40)
| 
| 12.12 (84)
| Princes Park
| 26,796
| 23 July 1960
|- bgcolor="#FFFFFF"
| 
| 10.20 (80)
| 
| 11.13 (79)
| Lake Oval
| 8,350
| 23 July 1960

Round 14

|- bgcolor="#CCCCFF"
| Home team
| Home team score
| Away team
| Away team score
| Venue
| Crowd
| Date
|- bgcolor="#FFFFFF"
| 
| 5.9 (39)
| 
| 9.21 (75)
| Western Oval
| 16,794
| 30 July 1960
|- bgcolor="#FFFFFF"
| 
| 9.11 (65)
| 
| 6.9 (45)
| Victoria Park
| 39,110
| 30 July 1960
|- bgcolor="#FFFFFF"
| 
| 10.12 (72)
| 
| 11.17 (83)
| Princes Park
| 24,684
| 30 July 1960
|- bgcolor="#FFFFFF"
| 
| 9.13 (67)
| 
| 12.7 (79)
| Punt Road Oval
| 8,500
| 30 July 1960
|- bgcolor="#FFFFFF"
| 
| 10.10 (70)
| 
| 16.13 (109)
| Lake Oval
| 18,000
| 30 July 1960
|- bgcolor="#FFFFFF"
| 
| 7.11 (53)
| 
| 14.11 (95)
| Kardinia Park
| 15,022
| 30 July 1960

Round 15

|- bgcolor="#CCCCFF"
| Home team
| Home team score
| Away team
| Away team score
| Venue
| Crowd
| Date
|- bgcolor="#FFFFFF"
| 
| 14.16 (100)
| 
| 9.20 (74)
| Arden Street Oval
| 10,000
| 6 August 1960
|- bgcolor="#FFFFFF"
| 
| 13.13 (91)
| 
| 10.11 (71)
| Brunswick Street Oval
| 14,232
| 6 August 1960
|- bgcolor="#FFFFFF"
| 
| 14.11 (95)
| 
| 8.10 (58)
| Windy Hill
| 21,000
| 6 August 1960
|- bgcolor="#FFFFFF"
| 
| 9.16 (70)
| 
| 13.9 (87)
| Junction Oval
| 16,300
| 6 August 1960
|- bgcolor="#FFFFFF"
| 
| 16.15 (111)
| 
| 9.11 (65)
| MCG
| 81,099
| 6 August 1960
|- bgcolor="#FFFFFF"
| 
| 13.10 (88)
| 
| 9.7 (61)
| Glenferrie Oval
| 16,000
| 6 August 1960

Round 16

|- bgcolor="#CCCCFF"
| Home team
| Home team score
| Away team
| Away team score
| Venue
| Crowd
| Date
|- bgcolor="#FFFFFF"
| 
| 10.14 (74)
| 
| 4.10 (34)
| Kardinia Park
| 9,445
| 13 August 1960
|- bgcolor="#FFFFFF"
| 
| 8.12 (60)
| 
| 7.7 (49)
| Victoria Park
| 22,640
| 13 August 1960
|- bgcolor="#FFFFFF"
| 
| 7.15 (57)
| 
| 6.8 (44)
| Princes Park
| 16,291
| 13 August 1960
|- bgcolor="#FFFFFF"
| 
| 13.13 (91)
| 
| 7.12 (54)
| Lake Oval
| 6,109
| 13 August 1960
|- bgcolor="#FFFFFF"
| 
| 9.13 (67)
| 
| 11.10 (76)
| MCG
| 24,646
| 13 August 1960
|- bgcolor="#FFFFFF"
| 
| 4.6 (30)
| 
| 7.11 (53)
| Western Oval
| 12,013
| 13 August 1960

Round 17

|- bgcolor="#CCCCFF"
| Home team
| Home team score
| Away team
| Away team score
| Venue
| Crowd
| Date
|- bgcolor="#FFFFFF"
| 
| 9.17 (71)
| 
| 8.4 (52)
| Glenferrie Oval
| 13,000
| 20 August 1960
|- bgcolor="#FFFFFF"
| 
| 9.7 (61)
| 
| 10.12 (72)
| Windy Hill
| 29,500
| 20 August 1960
|- bgcolor="#FFFFFF"
| 
| 8.3 (51)
| 
| 5.9 (39)
| Victoria Park
| 22,267
| 20 August 1960
|- bgcolor="#FFFFFF"
| 
| 9.12 (66)
| 
| 5.6 (36)
| Princes Park
| 17,100
| 20 August 1960
|- bgcolor="#FFFFFF"
| 
| 9.14 (68)
| 
| 8.12 (60)
| Punt Road Oval
| 8,000
| 20 August 1960
|- bgcolor="#FFFFFF"
| 
| 9.9 (63)
| 
| 6.15 (51)
| Junction Oval
| 16,100
| 20 August 1960

Round 18

|- bgcolor="#CCCCFF"
| Home team
| Home team score
| Away team
| Away team score
| Venue
| Crowd
| Date
|- bgcolor="#FFFFFF"
| 
| 9.9 (63)
| 
| 14.12 (96)
| Kardinia Park
| 14,857
| 27 August 1960
|- bgcolor="#FFFFFF"
| 
| 18.9 (117)
| 
| 11.11 (77)
| Western Oval
| 12,419
| 27 August 1960
|- bgcolor="#FFFFFF"
| 
| 9.16 (70)
| 
| 6.9 (45)
| Brunswick Street Oval
| 19,507
| 27 August 1960
|- bgcolor="#FFFFFF"
| 
| 10.5 (65)
| 
| 10.18 (78)
| MCG
| 50,274
| 27 August 1960
|- bgcolor="#FFFFFF"
| 
| 6.8 (44)
| 
| 11.12 (78)
| Arden Street Oval
| 27,000
| 27 August 1960
|- bgcolor="#FFFFFF"
| 
| 8.8 (56)
| 
| 11.9 (75)
| Lake Oval
| 11,000
| 27 August 1960

Ladder

Consolation Night Series Competition
The night series were held under the floodlights at Lake Oval, South Melbourne, for the teams (5th to 12th on ladder) out of the finals at the end of the season.

Final: South Melbourne 10.12 (70) defeated Hawthorn 8.11 (59)

Premiership Finals

First Semi-Final

Second Semi-Final

Preliminary Final

Grand final

Awards
 The 1960 VFL Premiership team was Melbourne.
 The VFL's leading goalkicker was Ron Evans of Essendon who kicked 67 goals.
 The winner of the 1960 Brownlow Medal was John Schultz of Footscray with 20 votes.
 Richmond took the "wooden spoon" in 1960.
Geelong 7.15 (57) defeated  7.10 (52) in the Grand Final, held as a curtain raiser to the seniors Grand Final on 24 September.

Notable events
From 1960, the Seconds became known as the VFL Reserves; and, the Thirds became known as the Under 19s.
 The entire season was plagued by wet weather. This was reflected in the overall low scores of the full-forwards: Ron Evans (Essendon) was the leading goalkicker with only 67 goals in 18 games, and Leo Brereton (Carlton) was second with 44 goals in 18 games.
 John Kennedy took over as coach of Hawthorn. The flamboyant Hawthorn centreman, Brendan Edwards, at the time a physical education teacher at the junior school of the nearby Swinburne Technical College, introduced circuit training.
 In the Round 3 match between Hawthorn and Footscray at Glenferrie Oval, Footscray defeated Hawthorn 6.17 (53) to 6.9 (45). The match was so affected by the strong wind conditions and, especially, the defensive play of the Hawthorn back-line – at a time when one could kick the ball out of bounds on the full without penalty – that the prescribed playing time of 100 minutes was extended by an astonishing 32 minutes and 33 seconds of time-on, including 10 minutes 46 seconds in the first quarter alone.
 In Round 13, Hawthorn defeated Collingwood at Victoria Park for the first time; Hawthorn had lost the previous 28 meetings at Victoria Park. Full forward John Peck marked on the final siren and kicked a goal to give Hawthorn the win by a point.
 The Brownlow Medal was won by Footscray's ruckman John Schultz. Schultz was the second of the only two amateur players to win the Brownlow Medal; the first had been Melbourne's Don Cordner, also a ruckman, in 1946.
 Former classmates at Caulfield Grammar School, John Schultz and Ron Evans, won the Brownlow Medal and topped the VFL Goalkicking List respectively in the same VFL season.  
 Melbourne played in its seventh successive Grand Final, thrashing Collingwood 8.14 (62) to 2.2 (14). Collingwood's score was its lowest since Round 5, 1900, and the lowest by any team in a Grand Final since 1927.
 At the end of the 1960 season, the VFL estimated that the live telecast of the last quarter of three VFL matches each Saturday afternoon had cost at least 245,000 spectators, and the VFL decided to discontinue this practice (which had been introduced in 1957).

References

 Rogers, S. & Brown, A., Every Game Ever Played: VFL/AFL Results 1897–1997 (Sixth Edition), Viking Books, (Ringwood), 1998. 
 Ross, J. (ed), 100 Years of Australian Football 1897–1996: The Complete Story of the AFL, All the Big Stories, All the Great Pictures, All the Champions, Every AFL Season Reported, Viking, (Ringwood), 1996. 
 Ross, J. (ed.), The Australian Football Hall of Fame, HarperCollinsPublishers, (Pymble), 1999.

External links
 1960 Season – AFL Tables

Australian Football League seasons
VFL season